Hall i' th' Wood is an early 16th-century manor house in Bolton in the historic county of Lancashire and the ceremonial county of Greater Manchester, England. It is a Grade I listed building and is currently used as a museum by Bolton Metropolitan Borough Council.  It was the manor house for the moiety of the Tonge with Haulgh township held by the Brownlows in the 16th century. The original building is timber framed and has a stone flagged roof; there were later additions to the house, built from stone, in 1591 and 1648. The name represents "Hall in the Wood' spoken in the local regional English dialect and is pronounced .

The house was not used as a gentry house but rather given over to multiple occupation by families engaged in industry. Four (previously five) separate dwellings can be identified, each with its own entrance and staircase. One part was let to Samuel Crompton during the 18th century, where he designed and built the first spinning mule. About 1779, Crompton succeeded in producing a mule-jenny, a machine which spun yarn suitable for use in the manufacture of muslin. It was known as the muslin wheel or the Hall i' th' Wood wheel from the name of the house.

Hall i' th' Wood was bought by William Lever (later Lord Leverhulme) in 1899 and was restored by Jonathan Simpson and Edward Ould. Lever gave the house to the Corporation of Bolton in 1900.

An episode of the television programme Most Haunted was filmed in the hall in 2008.

In Fisher's Drawing Room Scrap Book, 1833, is a poetical illustration by Letitia Elizabeth Landon to an engraving of a painting of the hall by William Linton. This dwells on the changes the hall has seen over the centuries.

See also

Grade I listed buildings in Greater Manchester
Listed buildings in Bolton
Hall i' th' Wood railway station

References

External links 

Hall i' th' Wood - history and visitor information, Bolton Museums and Archive Service
Hall i' th' Wood at bolton.org
Extract from A Short History of Hall i' th' Wood Compiled and Edited by Derek R. Mills (1992)

Country houses in Greater Manchester
Buildings and structures in Bolton
Historic house museums in Greater Manchester
Timber framed buildings in England
Grade I listed buildings in Greater Manchester
Grade I listed houses
Grade I listed museum buildings
History of Bolton
Tourist attractions in the Metropolitan Borough of Bolton